Springfield Hospital Center is a regional psychiatric hospital located in Sykesville, Maryland, United States.  It first opened in 1896.

William Patterson, a founder of the B&O railroad, built Springfield as a summer home and slave plantation on 3,000 acres. The estate was later purchased by Frank Brown who would become the Governor of Maryland. While serving as governor, he sold the estate to the State of Maryland for a mental hospital.

It is operated by the Maryland Department of Health through the Mental Hygiene Administration.  The historic core of the hospital was added to the National Register of Historic Places as the Warfield Complex, Hubner, and T Buildings in 2000.

See also
Henryton State Hospital

References

External links
Springfield Hospital Center website
train enthusiast website of Springfield spur

Psychiatric hospitals in Maryland
Hospitals established in 1896
Buildings and structures in Carroll County, Maryland
Sykesville, Maryland